Roohani Sisters, Dr. Jagriti Luthra Prasanna and Dr. Neeta Pandey Negi, are a Sufi singing duo from New Delhi, India. They perform different forms of music such as Sufi Music (Qawwali, Kafi, Ghazals), Sugam Bhakti Sangeet and Nirgun Bhakti Sangeet. Sugam Bhakti Sangeet like Guru Bhajans, Krishna Bhajans, Shiv Bhajans and Devi Bhajans which combines their classicism and modernity in right balance. They performed many Sufiyana Qalams of Saint like Bulleh Shah, Baba Farid, Rumi and Amir Khusrau. Dr. Jagriti Luthra Prasanna write and compose their own Sufi Qalams that has been a great hit with the listeners.

Overview
The Roohani Sisters rendered many poetry accredited to Kabir, Ramdas and Mirabai - the medieval Indian saint to which most of them are self- attribute. There poetries emphasize the transitory nature of life, non-attachment to the mundane, the inevitability of death, and salvation through devotion. They performed Nirgun Bhakti Sangeet at its excellence. This form of worship was propagated by Nirgun saints through their writings and songs by breaking away the oppressive caste and gender hierarchy associated with temple worship of icons.

Devotional music is their specialty. Coming from a Hindu upbringing they are also acknowledge that music has no boundaries. That is why their aim to maintain a balance and perfect blend of compositions consisting of different genres of music comprising Bhajans and Sufi renditions.

They started performing in 2009 together in India and outside and their first international performance was in 2017 at the Dhaka International Folk Fest. They sing mainly Sufiyana Qalams, Qawwali, Kafi, Ghazals, Bhajan and Punjabi Folk in traditional style merging it with the Jugalbandi style of Indian classical and semi-classical music. They sing in various languages such as Urdu, Hindi, Punjabi, and Persian.

Early life 
Dr. Jagriti and Dr. Neeta are born and raised in a Hindu family Delhi, India. Dr. Jagriti has origins from Punjab and Dr. Neeta is from Uttarakhand.

Dr. Jagriti has taken her basic Raagdari Taleem under Mrs. Ketaki Banerjee from Kirana Gharana. She learnt Indian classical music from Shri. Ritesh Mishra and his father Padma Bhushan Pt.Rajan and Sajan Mishra of the Banaras Gharana. She is also a sincere disciple of Ustaad Sakhawat Hussain, Grandson of Padma Bhushan Ustaad Mushtaq Hussain Khan of Rampur-Sahaswan gharana from whom she learnt the technicalities of Sufi and Ghazal Gayaki.

Dr. Neeta, inspired by her grandfather Shri Shiv Charan Pandey, started learning Indian classical music at an early age. She learnt Indian Classical Music from Lt. Shri Vipin Mudgaliya and Smt.Indu Mudgal of Gandharva Mahavidyalaya, New Delhi and Mrs.Ketaki Banerjee from Kirana Gharana. She learned Ghazal and semi-classical from Smt. Charanjeet Soni and Sufiyana Gayaki under the able guidance of her guru Lt. Ustad Iqbal Ahmad Khan, Khalifa of Dilli Gharana.

Dr. Neeta appeared in various Indian TV reality shows like Voice of India, Sa Re Ga Ma Pa Challenge 2005 and Indian Idol.

Meanwhile, both did their PhD in Music from Delhi University and were toppers in their respective institution.

Career 
They performed at Jahan-e-Khusrau to commemorate the death anniversary of the saint Amir Khusrau in Delhi.

 In 2022, they performed at Swasthyam Global Wellness Celebration in Pune.
 In 2022 they performed at the International Kullu Dussehra Festival, Kullu Himachal Pradesh.
 They released their new songs, "Dildaar Sadke" on 2nd November, 2022 under the label of Zee Music Company.
 In 2022, they performed at the 26th edition of the Fez Festival of World Sacred Music,Morocco.
 They released their new songs, "Karam Farma De Maula" and "Mawaan Labhdiyan Nai" on their YouTube Channel.
 In 2021, they performed at Dada Saheb Phalke International Film Festival in Mumbai.
 In 2021, they performed in Peer Prayi Jaane Na, a cultural program to commemorate the death anniversary of Mahatma Gandhi, at the Lokrang Festival in Bhopal.
 In 2020, they performed at Wajid Ali Shah Festival in Lucknow, UP.
 In 2019, they performed at Jahan-e-Khusrau, Jaipur Literature Festival, Dilli Durbaar,Sahitya Aajtak and Jashn-e-Adab.
 In 2019, they performed at Swarganga Music Festival in collaboration with Pracheen Kala Kendra, Chandigarh.
 In 2019, they performed at Ahmedabad International Literature Festival in Ahmedabad, Gujarat.
 They released their song “Bedardan” on 12 March 2019 under the T-Series label.
 Their music video "Mennu Ishq Samajh Na Aave" was composed by Dj Sheizwood and released by Apeksha Films & Music on YouTube.
 In 2019, they performed "Amrit Rasvaadan" (Sufi Night) organized by JMV Global Foundation in association with the Club Patio.
 In 2018, they performed in New Year Celebration at CM Arvind Kejriwal’s Residence.
 In 2018, they performed in Aambrotsave organized at Central Park, Connaught Place, New Delhi.
 They came live during a Thalassemia awareness initiative curated by SUBURB in association with Honda Motorcycle and Scooter India, Private Limited.
 In 2017, they performed at Dhaka International Folk Fest, 2017 in Bangladesh.
 They also have performed at ICCR, SPIC MACAY and Sangeet Natak Akademi's music festivals.

Awards and recognitions 

 Narishakti Puruskar (2019)
 REX Karmaveer Global Fellowship & Karmaveer Chakra Award (2019)

Personal life 
In 2012, Dr. Jagriti Luthra Prasanna married Sh. Rajesh Prasanna well-known flute artist performing in various national and international arenas. He is the son of renowned Indian classical flautist and shehnai (Indian oboe) player Pt. Rajendra Prasanna from Benares Gharana.

In 2012, Dr. Neeta Pandey Negi married Sh. Rajneesh Negi, founder of Marketing Edtech platform PMT India Learning and shifted to Dehradun.

References

External links 
 Official Website
 
 
 

Sufi artists
Indian Sufis
Sufi music
Qawwali
Performers of Sufi music
Indian women folk singers
Indian folk singers
Indian musical duos
Indian qawwali singers
Sa Re Ga Ma Pa participants
Singers from Delhi
Women musicians from Delhi